Moonlight in Vermont can refer to: 

Moonlight in Vermont (film), a 1943 film
"Moonlight in Vermont" (song), a popular song best known in a recording by Margaret Whiting with Billy Butterfield's Orchestra
Moonlight in Vermont (album), a 1956 compilation jazz album by Johnny Smith
 Moonlight in Vermont, a 2017 film